The Hunter 27-2 is an American sailboat that was designed by the Hunter Design Team as a family cruiser and first built in 1989.

The design was originally marketed by the manufacturer as the Hunter 27, but is now usually referred to as the Hunter 27-2 to differentiate it from the unrelated 1974 Hunter 27 and later designs with the same name.

Production
The Hunter 27-2 was built by Hunter Marine in the United States between 1989 and 1994, but it is now out of production.

Design

The Hunter 27-2 is a recreational keelboat, built predominantly of fiberglass, with wood trim. It has a fractional sloop rig with swept-back spreaders, a raked stem, a walk-through reverse transom with a swimming platform, an internally-mounted spade-type rudder controlled by a wheel, with an emergency tiller and a fixed wing keel. It displaces  and carries  of ballast.

The boat is normally fitted with a small  outboard motor for docking and maneuvering, although a Japanese Yanmar 1GM-10  diesel engine was a factory option.

The boat was delivered with many features as standard equipment, including a 110% genoa, stainless steel swim ladder, teak and holly interior, dinette table, enclosed head with a shower and sink with hot and cold water, two-burner stove, sleeping accommodation for six people, two life jackets, automatic bilge pump and a fog bell.

The design has a PHRF racing average handicap of 192 with a high of 186 and low of 201.

See also

List of sailing boat types

Related development
Hunter 27
Hunter 27-3
Hunter 27 Edge

Similar sailboats
Aloha 27
C&C 27
Cal 27
Cal 2-27
Cal 3-27
Catalina 27
Catalina 270
Catalina 275 Sport
Crown 28
CS 27
Edel 820
Express 27
Fantasia 27
Halman Horizon
Hotfoot 27
Hullmaster 27
Irwin 27 
Island Packet 27
Mirage 27 (Perry)
Mirage 27 (Schmidt)
Mirage 275
O'Day 272
Orion 27-2
Tanzer 27
Watkins 27
Watkins 27P

References

External links

Original factory brochure

Keelboats
1980s sailboat type designs
Sailing yachts
Sailboat type designs by Hunter Design Team
Sailboat types built by Hunter Marine